Albert Wenger is a German-American businessman and venture capitalist. Wenger is a managing partner at Union Square Ventures, a New York City-based venture capital firm with investments in companies such as Twilio, Etsy, Firebase, Behance, and MongoDB.

Early life and education
Wenger won the German high school computer science competition when he was 18. Wenger earned his PhD in Information Technology from the MIT in 1999 under the supervision of Erik Brynjolfsson and Bengt Holmström.

Career
Albert Wenger joined Union Square Ventures as a venture partner in 2006 following the sale of Delicious to Yahoo in 2005 where he had been the president. He led USV's investment in Etsy, where he was also a personal angel investor. He became a General Partner in 2008 and a Managing Partner in 2017. Notable investments include Series A rounds in Etsy (IPO 2015), Twilio (IPO 2016), MongoDB (IPO 2017) as well as Behance (acquired by Adobe) and Firebase (acquired by Google).

Wenger also co-founded DailyLit, The Spark of Hudson, and HudsonUP, and is an investor in Ziggeo.

Personal life
Wenger and his wife Susan Danziger have three children together. Their youngest son works as a fashion designer in New York.

References 

American venture capitalists
Massachusetts Institute of Technology alumni
Living people
Harvard College alumni
Year of birth missing (living people)